"My Old Kentucky Home" is a song by Stephen Foster.

My Old Kentucky Home or Old Kentucky Home may also refer to:

In places
My Old Kentucky Home State Park, a park in Bardstown, Kentucky, U.S.
Old Kentucky Home, alternative name for the Thomas Wolfe House in Asheville, North Carolina

In media and entertainment
My Old Kentucky Home (1922 film), a 1922 American silent drama film directed by Ray C. Smallwood
My Old Kentucky Home (1926 film), an American animated short by Max and Dave Fleischer using the Lee DeForest Phonofilm sound-on-film system
My Old Kentucky Home (1938 film), an American romantic drama film directed by Lambert Hillyer
"My Old Kentucky Home" (Mad Men), season 3, episode 3 of the television series Mad Men (2009)
Old Kentucky Home, the popular name of Negro Life at the South (1859), a painting by Eastman Johnson
Old Kentucky Home, a song by Randy Newman from 12 Songs (1970) that mocks the gentility of Foster's song